Duqueco River, Río Duqueco, is a river of the Biobío Region of Chile.

External links

Rivers of Chile
Rivers of Biobío Region